Oštrik (Serbian Cyrillic: Оштрик) is a mountain in southwestern Serbia, between towns of Priboj, Prijepolje and Nova Varoš. Its highest peak Veliki Oštrik has an elevation of 1,283 meters above sea level.

References

Mountains of Serbia